Eucalyptus calcicola, commonly known as the Boranup mallee, Harry Butler's mallee or Hamelin Bay mallee, is a mallee that is endemic to a small area in the south-west of Western Australia. It has smooth, pale greenish bark, lance-shaped to curved adult leaves, flower buds in groups of seven or nine, white flowers and ribbed, cup-shaped to hemispherical fruit.

Description
It has smooth, pale greenish grey bark that is shed in strips. Flowering occurs between January and June and the flowers are white.

Taxonomy and naming
Eucalyptus calcicola was first formally described in 1974 by Ian Brooker from a specimen collected by K.M Allen in 1971 from near Cape Freycinet. The description was published in the journal Nuytsia.

In 2002, Dean Nicolle described two subspecies:

The specific epithet (calcicola) is derived from Latin words meaning "limestone" and "dweller" referring to the habitat of this species. The epithet unita is a Latin word meaning "united", referring to this subspecies being a link between subspecies calcicola and E. ligulata.

Distribution and habitat
Subspecies calcicola  mainly grows on limestone dunes between Cape Freycinet and Cape Hamelin in far south coastal regions of Western Australia. Subspecies unita occurs between Point Hillier near Denmark and Bremer Bay.

Conservation
Both subspecies of E. calcicola are classified as "Priority Four" by the Government of Western Australia Department of Parks and Wildlife, meaning that is rare or near threatened.

See also
List of Eucalyptus species

References

Eucalypts of Western Australia
Trees of Australia
calcicola
Myrtales of Australia
Plants described in 1974
Taxa named by Ian Brooker